Chaplin: A Life is a 2008 biography of the actor Charlie Chaplin by American psychoanalyst Stephen M. Weissman. The book examines young Chaplin's early childhood experiences and the formative role they later played in shaping his art. An ex-London street urchin, Chaplin used humor to creatively transform real life boyhood experiences of homelessness into his screen character's picaresque adventures as the streetwise Little Tramp.

External links
Official website

2008 non-fiction books
British biographies
Charlie Chaplin